Ann duCille is Professor of English, Emerita at Wesleyan University who is a scholar of African-American literature, cultural studies, and Black feminist theory. Born in Brooklyn, New York, duCille earned a Bachelor of Arts degree from Bridgewater State College and then a Master's degree and PhD in English from Brown University.

Biography
DuCille began her career at Hamilton College in 1974 where she and two others became the first three Black women faculty on staff. In 1990, duCille joined the faculty of Wesleyan University and later also worked at the University of California, San Diego. In 2016, duCille became the Inaugural Distinguished Professor in Residence for the Black Feminist Theory Project at the Pembroke Center, Brown University. DuCille currently serves as an advisor to that project, which is a visiting scholar initiative that invites black feminist theorists to campus each year. She is also a curatorial advisor to the Pembroke Center's Feminist Theory Archive in regard to the papers of black feminist theorists.

Publications
 Coupling and convention : marriage, sex, and subjectivity in novels by and about African American women, 1853-1948, 1991
 The coupling convention : sex, text, and tradition in Black women's fiction, 1993
 The occult of true black womanhood : critical demeanor and black feminist studies, 1994
 Dyes and dolls : multicultural Barbie and the merchandising of difference, 1994
 Skin trade, 1996
 Where in the world is William Wells Brown? : Thomas Jefferson, Sally Hemings, and the DNA of African- American literary history, 2000
 Technicolored : reflections on race in the time of TV, 2018

References

External links
 Ann duCille Papers, Pembroke Center Archives, Brown University

Living people
Year of birth missing (living people)
Wesleyan University faculty
People from Brooklyn
Brown University alumni
Bridgewater State University alumni
African-American women academics
American women academics
Hamilton College (New York) faculty
University of California, San Diego faculty
Brown University faculty
African-American feminists
American curators
American women curators
Academics from New York (state)
American academics of English literature
African-American academics
20th-century American non-fiction writers
21st-century American non-fiction writers
20th-century American women writers
21st-century American women writers
20th-century African-American women writers
20th-century African-American writers
21st-century African-American women writers
21st-century African-American writers